Shahrak-e Mojahedin (also Romanized as Shahrak-e Mojāhedīn) is a village in Chenaneh Rural District, Fath Olmobin District, Shush County, Khuzestan Province, Iran. At the 2006 census, its population was 505, in 73 families.

References 

Populated places in Shush County